Damxung is a county of Lhasa City, lying to the north of its main center of Chengguan, in the Tibet Autonomous Region of the People's Republic of China. Its administrative seat is Damquka.
As of 2013 the population was 40,000, with most of the people engaged in animal husbandry.

History

Damxung means "select pasture" in the Tibetan language. The Damxung steppe was gifted by the 5th Dalai Lama to Güshi Khan during the latter's reign. A number of Mongol cavalry soldiers settled down in the area, who became known as Mongol Eight Banners of Dam. After Güshi Khan's death in 1679, the area was possessed by Ngakpa Tratsang of Sera Monastery. From 1715 to 1912, the former Mongol Eight Banners land was directly administered by the Qing Dynasty Amban. Following the Qing's collapse, the area once again came under possession of Sera Monastery, which established Damxung Dzong under Domê Chikyab (zh), predecessor of the modern Chamdo Prefecture. In 1956, the county was transferred to Lhasa City. In 1959, Petsang and Yangbajain merged into Damxung to form the modern Damxung County.

Geography

The county is tectonically active and was the epicenter of a 7.5Mw earthquake in the north in 1952 and a 6.4 Mw earthquake in the south in 2008.
In November 2010 a moderate quake in Damxung at 5.2 on the Richter scale shook office windows in Lhasa.
There were no casualties, but houses were damaged.

Namtso is one of the great lakes of the Tibetan plateau.
The Nyenchen Tanglha (or Nyainqentanglha) mountains extend along the northwest of the county.
The Nyainqêntanglha mountains define the watershed between northern and southern Tibet.
A valley with elevation of about  runs parallel to the mountains to their southeast, sloping from northwest to southeast. 30% of the county's total area is in the prairie of this valley.

Climate

Damxung is cold and dry in the winter, cool and wet in summer, with very variable weather.
The land is frozen from the start of November to the following March. Pasture has 90–120 days for growth.

Administration

Damxung County was established in 1959, and is divided into two towns and six townships. 
The seat of government is in Dangquka.

Population and economy

As of 2013 the population was 40,000, up from 35,000 in 1997.
In 2000 Damxung had a total population of 39,169, of which 19,429 were male and 18,740 were female. Almost all were ethnic Tibetans. 
The rural population was 36,607 and the urban population 2,562.
As of 2009 there were 37 primary and secondary school buildings.
There were seven hospitals, including a county hospital, with a total of 40 beds and 161 medical personnel.

Natural grasslands cover , of which 68% is considered excellent.
Almost all the people are engaged in rearing livestock, including yaks, sheep, goats and horses.
In 1999 the herds other than horses included 224,600 sheep (42.55%), 179,600 yak (34.02%), 116,900 goats (22.14%).

The Qinghai-Tibet Highway (China National Highway 109) runs from east to west across the county.
Damxung railway station links the county to the city of Lhasa to the south.
There is a large geothermal field at Yangbajain. This is harnessed by generating units that deliver 25,180 kW, or 100 million kilowatt hours annually, to the city of Lhasa to the south.
The transmission line follows the Duilong River south through Doilungdêqên District.
Yangbajain Geothermal Field is currently the largest proven geothermal field of its nature in China.
There is a gypsum mine with reserves of 100 million tons in Uma township.
Other mineral resources include aluminum, tin, lead, zinc and copper.

Monuments

Kangma Monastery (康玛寺) is in Chonggar Village, Gungtang Township, Damxung County,  from the county seat.
The monastery belonged to the Gelug sect, and was administered by the Hardongkangcun of the Tantric School of Sera Monastery. 
As of 2003 it had 62 monks and was the largest monastery in Damxung. It was said to have been built by a monk from Kangma in Garze Prefecture.
They are about three hundred years old.
The temple stands on a barren slope below a mountain, but the meeting room has electric light and heating.
The temple operates a tea house and a grocery store. The monks have built a two-story dormitory.

Yangpachen Monastery is a Tibetan Buddhist monastery in Yangbajain, historically the seat of the Shamarpas of Karma Kagyu.
It is the main monastery of the Red Hat school of the Karma Kagyu sect.
It was built in 1490, and through extensive repairs and additions grew into a major architectural complex that contained a large collection of cultural relics.
The Red Hat school of Karma Kagyu died out in 1791. The monastery was destroyed during the Cultural Revolution, but later was rebuilt.

The Eight Towers of Northern Tibet (藏北八塔) in Wumatang (Uma) townland are said to be the guardians of the grasslands of northern Tibet.
One story of their origin is that eight generals of King Gesar, who unified the grasslands of northern Tibet, were killed at this place and the towers were built to commemorate them. Another says that the eight generals of the Mongol army were killed here. This may be more plausible, since the names seem to have Mongol origins.

Namtso lake is the second-largest salt lake in China. It has vivid turquoise-blue waters and is set in spectacular scenery.
It is situated on the Tashi Dor promontory.
It is more a chapel than a monastery, with two small buildings holding images of local deities.

References

Sources